John M. Ward (March 8, 1907 – December 29, 1968) was an American football player. He played college football for USC and was "rated one of the strongest linemen in Troy's history." He turned pro in 1930, playing in the National Football League (NFL) as a tackle for the Frankford Yellow Jackets and Minneapolis Red Jackets. He appeared in 13 NFL games, all as a starter.

References

1907 births
1968 deaths
USC Trojans football players
Frankford Yellow Jackets players
Minneapolis Red Jackets players
Players of American football from California
Sportspeople from Santa Ana, California
American football tackles